Saska Kokalovska (born 8 December 1996) is a Macedonian footballer who plays as a midfielder for 1. liga club ŽFK Kočani. She has been a member of the North Macedonia women's national team.

References

1996 births
Living people
Women's association football midfielders
Macedonian women's footballers
North Macedonia women's international footballers